The 2018–19 UEFA Nations League C was the third division of the 2018–19 edition of the UEFA Nations League, the inaugural season of the international football competition involving the men's national teams of the 55 member associations of UEFA.

Format
League C consisted of 15 UEFA members ranked from 25 to 39, which were split into four groups (one group of three and three groups of four). The top two teams of each group were promoted to the 2020–21 UEFA Nations League B, and the bottom four ranked teams were initially relegated to the 2020–21 UEFA Nations League D (the bottom teams of Group 2, 3, and 4, along with the lowest ranked third-placed team of League C). However, following UEFA announcement of format changes for the next edition's groups in September 2019, none of the 2018–19 League C teams were relegated to League D.

In addition, League C was allocated one of the four remaining UEFA Euro 2020 places. The play-off berths were first allocated to each Nations League group winner, and if any of the group winners had already qualified for the European Championship finals, then to the next best ranked team of the league, etc. As Finland already qualified for the European Championship finals through regular qualifiers, the seven best ranked teams from League C competed in the play-offs, played in October and November 2020.

Seeding
Teams were allocated to League C according to their UEFA national team coefficients after the conclusion of the 2018 FIFA World Cup qualifying group stage on 11 October 2017. Teams were split into four pots (three pots of four teams and one pot of the three lowest teams), ordered based on their UEFA national team coefficient. The group with three teams contained teams only from pots 1, 2, and 3. The seeding pots for the draw were announced on 7 December 2017.

The group draw took place at the SwissTech Convention Center in Lausanne, Switzerland on 24 January 2018, 12:00 CET. Due to winter venue restrictions, a group could only contain a maximum of two of the following teams: Norway, Finland, Estonia, Lithuania.

Groups
The fixture list was confirmed by UEFA on 24 January 2018 following the draw.

Times are CET/CEST, as listed by UEFA (local times, if different, are in parentheses).

Group 1

Group 2

Group 3

Group 4

Goalscorers

Overall ranking
The 15 League C teams were ranked 25th to 39th overall in the 2018–19 UEFA Nations League according to the following rules:
The teams finishing first in the groups will be ranked 25th to 28th according to the results of the league phase, not taking into account results against the fourth-placed teams.
The teams finishing second in the groups will be ranked 29th to 32nd according to the results of the league phase, not taking into account results against the fourth-placed teams.
The teams finishing third in the groups will be ranked 33rd to 36th according to the results of the league phase, not taking into account results against the fourth-placed teams.
The teams finishing fourth in the groups will be ranked 37th to 39th according to the results of the league phase, taking into account all results.

Prize money
The prize money to be distributed was announced in March 2018. Each team in League C received a solidarity fee of €750,000. In addition, the four group winners received double this amount with a €750,000 bonus fee. This meant that the maximum amount of solidarity and bonus fees for a team from League C was €1.5 million.

Euro 2020 qualifying play-offs

The seven best teams in League C according to the overall ranking that did not qualify for UEFA Euro 2020 through the qualifying group stage competed in the play-offs, with the winners qualifying for the final tournament.

Notes

References

External links

League C